Hind Al-Fayez (born 1968) is a Jordanian journalist, politician and former member of the Parliament of Jordan, elected in 2013. 

Al-Fayez is the daughter of  Hakem Al-Fayez.

She gained worldwide attention in 2015, after a Jordanian member of parliament told her to sit down after she interrupted him, she was featured on many western news channels such as CNN.

See also 

 Mithqal Al Fayez
 Al-Fayez

References

People from Amman
Jordanian Muslims
1968 births
Living people
Jordanian journalists
21st-century Jordanian women politicians
Members of the House of Representatives (Jordan)
Hind